Landeskunde Entdecken Online (better known as LEO-BW) is a regional online information system for Baden-Württemberg, Germany.

Content

Atlas 
In 2015, the Historical Atlas of Baden-Württemberg was incorporated into LEO-BW.

German archives 
On February 22, 2018, the Südwestdeutsche Archivalienkunde (Southwest German Archival Records) was incorporated into LEO-BW, linking millions of documents into LEO-BW. The oldest of these documents come from the Middle Ages.

Weimar Republic 
On November 8, 2017, the topic "From the Monarchy to the Republic" was released. It contained 900,000 documents of the Weimar Republic.

History 
The plans for LEO-BW were first initiated in 2010 order to celebrate the 60th birthday of the State of Baden-Württemberg. However, the website wasn't opened until April 25, 2012.

References

External links 

 Official website

Baden-Württemberg